The British Telecommunications Act 1981 (1981 c.38) is an act of the Parliament of the United Kingdom that transferred the state-owned telephone network from the Post office to a new statutory corporation, British Telecommunications, branded as "British Telecom".

References

United Kingdom Acts of Parliament 1981
BT Group
Telecommunications in the United Kingdom